Nunn Island is an ice-covered island,  long, lying within Getz Ice Shelf just south of Wright Island, along the coast of Marie Byrd Land. Mapped by United States Geological Survey (USGS) from surveys and U.S. Navy air photos, 1959–66. Named by Advisory Committee on Antarctic Names (US-ACAN) for R. Admiral Ira Nunn, U.S. Navy, responsible for legal elements of the Navy's Antarctic support during the IGY.

See also 
 List of Antarctic and sub-Antarctic islands

Islands of Marie Byrd Land